The Talas mine is one of the largest gold mines in the Kyrgyzstan and in the world. The mine is located in the north-west of the country in the Talas Province. The mine has estimated reserves of 3.7 million oz of gold.

References 

Gold mines in Kyrgyzstan